Brice Antwion McCain (born December 10, 1986) is a former American football cornerback. He was drafted by the Houston Texans in the sixth round of the 2009 NFL Draft. He has also played for the Pittsburgh Steelers, Miami Dolphins, and Tennessee Titans. He played college football at Utah.

High school career
McCain attended Terrell High School in Terrell, Texas where he was all-district as a running back and defensive back. He played cornerback, wide receiver and running back and returned punts and kickoffs. He also lettered in basketball and track, running 100 meters in 10.3 seconds, and was a member of the 400m relay team that placed second in the state (40.6 seconds).

He was considered a two-star recruit by Rivals.com.

College career
McCain attended the University of Utah from 2005 to 2008. He totaled 103 tackles in his career, with three interceptions and 21 pass breakups. He was a two-time all-MWC selection.

Professional career

Houston Texans
McCain was drafted by the Houston Texans in the sixth round (188th pick) of the 2009 NFL Draft.

After five seasons with the Texans, he was released on March 11, 2014.

Pittsburgh Steelers
McCain signed a one-year contract with the Pittsburgh Steelers on April 1, 2014.
McCain recorded his first interception as a Steeler in the Week 5 matchup against the Jaguars. He intercepted Blake Bortles and returned it for the second touchdown of his career. In the week 17 game against the Bengals, he intercepted Andy Dalton twice. Once in the first quarter with Dalton overthrowing a pass. The other was a tipped pass. The Steelers would go on to win that game 27-17.

Miami Dolphins
On March 11, 2015, he signed a two-year, $5.5 million contract with the Miami Dolphins. The deal included $3 million guaranteed. He was released by the Dolphins on February 12, 2016.

Tennessee Titans
On March 2, 2016, McCain signed a two-year deal with the Tennessee Titans worth $5 million, reuniting him with former Steelers defensive coordinator Dick LeBeau.

References

External links

Twitter
Miami Dolphins bio
Pittsburgh Steelers bio
Utah Utes bio

1986 births
Living people
Players of American football from Dallas
American football cornerbacks
Utah Utes football players
Houston Texans players
Pittsburgh Steelers players
Miami Dolphins players
Tennessee Titans players